These hits topped the Ultratop 50 in 1999.

See also
1999 in music

References

1999 in Belgium
1999 record charts
1999